Krisiun is a Brazilian death metal band, founded by brothers Alex Camargo (bass, vocals) (Born March 11, 1972), Moyses Kolesne (guitars) (Born August 11, 1973) and Max Kolesne (drums) (Born June 12, 1974). Since its formation in 1990, the group recorded two demos, Evil Age in 1991 and Curse of the Evil One in 1992, and self-released an extended play (EP) titled Unmerciful Order in 1993. After signing with Dynamo Records (a Brazilian label), Krisiun released the debut full-length Black Force Domain in 1995, followed by Apocalyptic Revelation, in 1998. They signed with major label Century Media in 1999, releasing a further nine studio albums.

History 
Krisiun was formed in 1990, by three brothers, vocalist/bassist Alex Camargo, guitarist Moyses Kolesne and drummer Max Kolesne (Alex uses his mother's maiden name). They have toured extensively through North America, South America and Europe (recording their first official DVD while in Poland).

The band is heavily influenced by the debut albums of Sodom, Kreator, Morbid Angel and Slayer. Their violent lyrics and very fast musical tempo make them one of the most eminent "extreme death metal" bands in the world.

They released two demos before moving to São Paulo in 1995. People there had already started to notice the budding talent of the band. Shortly after the move, their second guitarist Altemir Souza left the band and returned to Porto Alegre (where he died in a motorbike accident in 2002).

The Unmerciful Order EP (their only "major" recording featuring a second guitarist, namely Mauricio Nogueira of Torture Squad) established the band as a cult act, and that status was further confirmed by the release of their debut album Black Force Domain (now as a trio) in 1995. The following albums continued to improve their brutal and uncompromising approach to death metal.

In February–March 2007, the band toured North America with Unleashed, Belphegor and Hatesphere. The band spent May and June 2007 on the road through Europe alongside Immolation and Grave. Early September 2007 saw them hitting the road again touring Northern Europe.  And the last two weeks of September were spent in Russia on the Flaming Arts Festival tour. October 2007 saw Krisiun touring Poland and the Balkans extensively with Vader, Incantation and Rotting Christ.

In April–May 2008, the band recorded their latest in Stage One Studios in the city of Borgentreich, Germany. It was produced by Andy Classen who had worked with the Brazilians on the album Conquerors of Armageddon and AssassiNation.

The new album was given the name Southern Storm and the launch in Europe was 21 July 2008 via Century Media Records. The disc brought 12 new tracks and a version of "Refuse/Resist", the Sepultura classic from the Chaos A.D. album.

In 2009 they toured Europe with Nile and in 2010 they toured the U.S. with Nile and Immolation.

In September–October 2015, they were part of The Devastation on the Nation tour in North America. They co-headlined the tour Origin. With Aeon, Alterbeast, Soreption and Ingested as support.

Band members

Current
 Alex Camargo – bass, vocals 
 Moyses Kolesne – guitars 
 Max Kolesne – drums

Former
Altemir Souza – guitars 
Mauricio Nogueira – guitars

Discography

Studio albums
 1995: Black Force Domain
 1998: Apocalyptic Revelation
 2000: Conquerors of Armageddon
 2001: Ageless Venomous
 2003: Works of Carnage
 2004: Bloodshed
 2006: AssassiNation
 2008: Southern Storm
 2011: The Great Execution
 2015: Forged in Fury
 2018: Scourge of the Enthroned
 2022: Mortem Solis

Live albums
 2006: Live Armageddon

Compilation albums
 2012: Arise From Blackness

EPs
 1992: Curse of the Evil One
 1993: Rises from Black
 1994: Unmerciful Order

Demos
 1991: Evil Age
 1992: The Plague

Music videos

References

External links

 Official website
 Krisiun at Facebook
 Krisiun at MySpace
 Roadrunner Records Latest News

Family musical groups
Brazilian death metal musical groups
Musical groups established in 1990
Musical groups from Rio Grande do Sul
Century Media Records artists
Brazilian musical trios
1990 establishments in Brazil
GUN Records artists